Wrathful Journey (translit. Gnevno patuvane) is a 1971 Bulgarian drama film directed by Nikola Korabov. It was entered into the 7th Moscow International Film Festival.

Cast
 Iossif Surchadzhiev as Chavdar
 Dorotea Toncheva as Vanya
 Severina Teneva as Yuliya
 Nikola Todev as Bay Stoyan
 Georgi Kaloyanchev as Bashtata na Chavdar

References

External links
 

1971 films
1971 drama films
1970s Bulgarian-language films
Films directed by Nikola Korabov
Bulgarian drama films